Vesna Dolonc was the defending champion, having won the event in 2012, but she lost to Valentyna Ivakhnenko in the first round.

Elina Svitolina won the tournament, defeating Tímea Babos in the final, 3–6, 6–2, 7–6(11–9).

Seeds 

  Elina Svitolina (champion)
  Vesna Dolonc (first round)
  Tímea Babos (final)
  Dinah Pfizenmaier (semifinals)
  Maria João Koehler (semifinals)
  Kristýna Plíšková (first round)
  Alexandra Panova (first round)
  Ksenia Pervak (first round)

Main draw

Finals

Top half

Bottom half

References 
 Main draw

Viccourt Cup - Singles
Viccourt Cup
Viccourt Cup - Singles